Ivan Leontievich Leontiev  (Леонтьев, Иван Леонтьевич Saint Petersburg, 1856-1911) was a Russian army officer who wrote plays and novels under the pen name Ivan Shcheglov. His best known work is The Dacha Husband (Dachnyi muzh). The first English translation of Shcheglov's novel was made by Michael R. Katz in 2009.

References

1856 births
1911 deaths
Russian writers